Kaylin Irvine (born September 3, 1990) is a Canadian speed skater. She competes primarily in the short distance of 1000 m. Irvine qualified to compete at the 2014 Olympic Games as part of the Canadian team where she skated in the 1000 m event.

Career

2018 Winter Olympics
Irvine qualified to compete for Canada at the 2018 Winter Olympics.

References

External links

Living people
1990 births
Speed skaters from Calgary
Canadian female speed skaters
Speed skaters at the 2014 Winter Olympics
Speed skaters at the 2018 Winter Olympics
Olympic speed skaters of Canada
World Single Distances Speed Skating Championships medalists
21st-century Canadian women